CISV may refer to:

 Centro Italiano Studi Vessillologici (Italian Centre of Vexillological Studies)
 CISV International formerly known as Children's International Summer Villages